Roosevelt Boulevard may refer to:
County Route 623 (Cape May County, New Jersey) between Marmora and Ocean City, New Jersey
Florida State Road 686 in St. Petersburg, Florida
Roosevelt Boulevard (Jacksonville) in Jacksonville, Florida
Roosevelt Boulevard (Philadelphia) in Philadelphia, Pennsylvania